"For Life" is a song by South Korean–Chinese boy band Exo, released on December 19, 2016, as the lead single of their fifth extended play For Life. It was released in both Korean and Chinese by their label SM. This was the last single released before member Lay's extended hiatus.

Background and release 
Produced by Kenzie, Matthew Tishler and Aaron Benward, "For Life" is described as a "slow ballad" with a sweet piano melody and a beautiful string accompaniment, with lyrics that are about looking at one person for the rest of one's life.

Music video 
The Korean and Chinese music videos for "For Life" were released on December 19, 2016. The Korean music video has over 30 million views on Youtube.

Charts

Weekly charts

Monthly charts

Sales

Accolades

Music program awards

References 

Exo songs
2016 songs
2016 singles
Korean-language songs
SM Entertainment singles
Songs written by Kenzie (songwriter)
Songs written by Aaron Benward
Songs written by Matthew Tishler